Hospital Ship is a South Korean television series starring Ha Ji-won and Kang Min-hyuk. 
The series is directed by Park Jae-bum and written by screenwriter Yoon Sun-joo. It aired on MBC every Wednesday and Thursday at 22:00 (KST) and started on August 30, 2017.

Plot
The story is about a group of young doctors who provide medical care to the locals who live in rural villages via a hospital ship that sails around the little islands.

Song Eun Jae is an immensely talented surgeon. There was a time when the hospital ship was just used for standard checkups and administering medicine. With Song Eun Jae on board, it can provide complicated surgery. She has seen a lot of success as a surgeon, but also a lot of struggles in her family life. When an unfortunate incident leads her to a ship instead of a prestigious hospital, she has little compassion for the stubborn elderly patients.

Kwak Hyun is the emotional opposite of his senior doctor, Song Eun Jae. Growing up with a father who is a lauded humanitarian, Kwak Hyun strives to be a warm and caring person. He heals not just with medicine but a smile. It seems natural that he works at his father's ship, but Kwak Hyun also has some emotional scars. He cannot match Song Eun Jae's medical skills, but he is infinitely better at connecting with patients.

Kim Jae Geol has Hallyu looks and an extensive lineage in medicine. His father is a respected doctor. Growing up, his dad always preferred his brilliant brother, which led Jae Geol to become a loner at heart. His father was obsessed with western medicine. As a form of rebellion, Kim Jae Gol studied oriental medicine, much to his father's disapproval. His goal in boarding the ship was to escape his father's shadow. At the ship, however, he must work under Song Eun Jae, who is just as strict, emotionless and disdainful of oriental medicine.

Now, these three doctors have to put aside their polar opposite personalities in order to treat their patients. As they all soon learn, working for your fellow humans has its own way of bringing people together.

Cast

Main
Ha Ji-won as Song Eun-jae
She is a capable surgeon and future chief at a large hospital located in Seoul who later joins the crew on the hospital ship due to her mother passing away
Kang Min-hyuk as Kwak Hyun
Son of a famous well known surgeon. He becomes a doctor because of his father and later volunteers to join the hospital ship as his military service. 
Lee Seo-won as Kim Jae-geol
Choi Seung-hoon as young Jae-gol
A chaebol oriental doctor whose father is a director of a general hospital. He was placed on the hospital ship and is good friends with Joon-young.
Kim In-sik as Cha Joon-young
A dentist who was placed on the hospital ship. He and Jae-geol are good friends.

Supporting

Hospital people
Kwon Mina as Yoo Ah-rim
Kim Kwang-kyu as Choo Won-gong
 as Pyo Go-eun

Hospital ship people
Lee Han-wi as Bang Sung-woo
 as Yang Choon-ho
Song Ji-ho as Kang Jung-ho

Family members
Cha Hwa-yeon as Oh Hye-jung, Eun-Jae's mother (Ep. 1-3)
Kim Sun-young as Oh Mi-jung, Eun-jae's aunt
Jo Sung-ha as Song Jae-joon
Jung In-gi as Kwak Sung
Nam Gi-ae as Lee Soo-kyung, Kwak Hyun's mother
 as Kim Soo-kwon
Park Joon-geum as Han Hee-sook
Lee Tae-ri as Song Woo-jae, a 28-year-old student and Eun-jae's younger brother

Others

Wang Ji-won as Choi Young-eun
Jeon No-min as Kim Do-hoon
Kang Da-hyun as Kwak Ji-eun	
 as Kang Yong-soo
Lee Da-hae
Jo A-ra as Yang Ji-young

Park Seung-chan
Lee Chung-hee
Seo Dan-won
Min Dae-sik
Jang Mun-gyu as Ki Kwan-sa
Sung Hyun-mi
Ryu Sung-ryul
Kim Mi-hye
Shin Shin-beom
Lee Chae-kyung
Song In-seob
 as Woojin's grandfather
Joo Boo-jin as Hospital patient

Lim Chae-yeon
Lee Dal
Kim Il-hyun
Hae Sun
Moon Kyung-min
Jung Young-geum
Kang Jung-goo

 as Park Oh-wol
Oh Ji-yeon
Nam Eun-ji
Jung Yeon
Kim Jong-soo
Park Dong-il
Sa Jae-won
Park Ji-il

Sa Chae-won

Special appearance
Jo Hyun-jae as Jang Sung-ho (Ep. 1-2, 10)
Park Sun-ho as Kim Jae-hwan (Ep. 1, 23-24)
Jung Dong-hwan as Jang Tae-joon, Jang Sung-ho's father

Production
First script reading took place July 6, 2017 at MBC Broadcasting Station in Sangam, Seoul, South Korea. Filming took place in Geojedo, South Korea.

Original soundtrack

Part 1

Part 2

Part 3

Part 4

Part 5

Special Track

Ratings
In the table below,  represent the lowest ratings and  represent the highest ratings.
NR denotes that the drama did not rank in the top 20 daily programs on that date.

Awards and nominations

International broadcast
In Singapore, Malaysia, Indonesia and Hong Kong, the series started airing on Oh!K from August 31, 2017.
In Myanmar, the series airing on Channel-7 HD (Myanmar) and CANAL+MAE MADE HD.
In Japan, the series airing on KNTV.
In Philippines, the series will be airing on TV5 this 2021.
In Vietnam, the series will air on VTV3 starting July 3, 2018.
In India, the series aired on Zee Anmol under the title Aspataal Ka Jahaaz , on Upconing (2018)

Notes

References

External links
 

MBC TV television dramas
2017 South Korean television series debuts
Korean-language television shows
South Korean romance television series
South Korean medical television series
Television series by Pan Entertainment

2017 South Korean television series endings